Kiput is a Malayo-Polynesian language spoken in northern Sarawak, Borneo, Malaysia.

Phonology
While the Northern Sarawakan languages in general are known for unusual phonological developments, Kiput stands out from the rest.

Vowels
Kiput has eight monophthongs , at least twelve diphthongs  and two triphthongs .

Consonants

References

Further reading

External links 
 Kaipuleohone archive includes written materials on Kiput

Languages of Malaysia
Berawan–Lower Baram languages
Endangered Austronesian languages